The following events occurred in April 1937:

April 1, 1937 (Thursday)
The Condor Legion carried out the Bombing of Jaén, killing 159 people.
The Government of India Act 1935 came into effect.
Born: Mohammad Hamid Ansari, diplomat and Vice President of India, in Calcutta, British India

April 2, 1937 (Friday)
Pennsylvania chocolate workers' strike: A sitdown strike began at the Hershey Chocolate Corporation.
Died: Jānis Buivids, 72, Latvian general

April 3, 1937 (Saturday)
Manchukuan Prince Pujie and Hiro Saga were married in a simple Shinto ceremony in Tokyo.

April 4, 1937 (Sunday)
Byron Nelson won the fourth Masters Tournament.
Died: Charles Henry Smyth, Jr., 71, American geologist

April 5, 1937 (Monday)
The first postage stamps bearing the face of Adolf Hitler went on sale in Germany to commemorate the Führer's 48th birthday.
The French liner Normandie crossed the Atlantic Ocean in record time, with an average speed of 30.98 knots.
Born: Colin Powell, U.S. Army general and statesman, in New York City (d. 2021)

April 6, 1937 (Tuesday)
Four U.S. Navy flyers were killed in a collision of two bomber planes during maneuvers off the coast of California.
Born: Merle Haggard, country musician, in Oildale, California (d. 2016); Peter Maivia, professional wrestler and grandfather of Dwayne "The Rock" Johnson, in American Samoa (d. 1982); Billy Dee Williams, actor and singer, in New York City

April 7, 1937 (Wednesday)
The Pennsylvania chocolate workers' strike ended when the strikers were forcibly removed from the factory.
Born: Graeme Davies, engineer and academic, in Auckland, New Zealand

April 8, 1937 (Thursday)
Austrian Chancellor Kurt Schuschnigg went back on his announcement of February 14 and said that the Habsburg monarchy could not be restored in the foreseeable future due to the tense international situation.
The Oshawa Strike began in Oshawa, Ontario, Canada when 4,000 General Motors workers walked off the job.
Born: Seymour Hersh, journalist and writer, in Chicago, Illinois

April 9, 1937 (Friday)
The Kamikaze became the first Japanese-built aircraft to fly from Japan to Europe.
Born: Valerie Singleton, television and radio presenter, in Hitchin, England
Died: Albert Paine, 75, American author and biographer

April 10, 1937 (Saturday)
British Prime Minister Stanley Baldwin announced that he would soon be retiring.
Born: Bella Akhmadulina, poet, in Moscow, USSR (d. 2010)
Died: Ralph Ince, 50, American actor, director and screenwriter (auto accident)

April 11, 1937 (Sunday)
The British cabinet held a rare Sunday meeting in which it decided to afford the fullest protection to British shipping outside the three-mile limit in northern Spanish waters. This was understood to include authorizing the Royal Navy to open fire on any Spanish vessels interfering with British cargo ships.
The Junkers Ju 89 prototype had its first flight, although it never entered production.

April 12, 1937 (Monday)
English engineer Frank Whittle and his team successfully tested a prototype jet engine.
The U.S. Supreme Court decided NLRB v. Jones & Laughlin Steel Corp.

April 13, 1937 (Tuesday)
The aircraft carrier  was launched.
Born: Stan Stasiak, professional wrestler, in Arvida, Quebec, Canada (d. 1997)

April 14, 1937 (Wednesday)
Ontario Premier Mitchell Hepburn forced two of his cabinet ministers to resign for opposing his handling of the Oshawa Strike.
The musical stage comedy Babes in Arms by Rodgers and Hart opened at the Shubert Theatre on Broadway. The show spawned several hit songs including "My Funny Valentine" and "The Lady is a Tramp".
Died: Ned Hanlon, 79, American baseball player and manager

April 15, 1937 (Thursday)
The Detroit Red Wings defeated the New York Rangers 3-0 to win the Stanley Cup, three games to two.
Born: Robert W. Gore, inventor and businessman, in Salt Lake City, Utah (d. 2020)

April 16, 1937 (Friday)
The Battle of Pozoblanco ended in Republican victory.
Born: George "The Animal" Steele, professional wrestler, in Detroit, Michigan (d. 2017)

April 17, 1937 (Saturday)
The character of Daffy Duck first appeared in the Porky Pig animated short film Porky's Duck Hunt.
Born: Don Buchla, synthesizer inventor, in South Gate, California (d. 2016); Ferdinand Piëch, business magnate, in Vienna, Austria (d. 2019)

April 18, 1937 (Sunday)
Premier Hepburn threatened to pass legislation to keep the Congress of Industrial Organizations out of Ontario, telling its head John L. Lewis that "he and his gang will never get their greedy paws on Ontario as long as I'm prime minister."
Born: Jan Kaplický, architect. in Prague, Czechoslovakia (d. 2009); Svetlana Nemolyaeva, actress, in Moscow, USSR; Teddy Taylor, politician, in Glasgow, Scotland (d. 2017)
Died: Julia Nussenbaum, 23 or 24, American violinist (murdered)

April 19, 1937 (Monday)
Generalissimo Francisco Franco unified the Falangists and Carlists into a single party called the Falange Española Tradicionalista y de las Juntas de Ofensiva Nacional Sindicalista.
The Non-Intervention Committee agreed to establish patrols of Spain's coasts. The patrols were authorized to determine the destination of vessels but not to carry out search and seizure operations. Germany and Italy were to monitor Republican ships while Britain and France would monitor the Nationalists. This scheme proved to be ineffective since the Germans could use ships flying the Panamanian or Liberian flags and unload their cargo in Portugal with the complicity of authorities there.
Anthony Eden told the House of Commons that the government would investigate reports that poison gas had been shipped from Germany to Spain.
Walter Young of Canada won the Boston Marathon.
The Golden Gate Bridge finished construction.
Born: Joseph Estrada, 13th President of the Philippines (1998-2001).
Died: Martin Conway, 1st Baron Conway of Allington, 81, English art critic, politician and mountaineer; William Morton Wheeler, 72, American entomologist, myrmecologist and Harvard professor

April 20, 1937 (Tuesday)
On Budget Day in the United Kingdom, Chancellor of the Exchequer Neville Chamberlain raised income and business taxes to achieve a small projected surplus of £282,000.
In Berlin, Hitler reviewed 14,000 troops parading in honour of his 48th birthday. Albert Speer presented Hitler with renderings and a first model of the Volkshalle.
B'nai B'rith was banned in Nazi Germany because of individual members spreading "communist propaganda".
Gee Walker of the Detroit Tigers hit for the cycle during a 4-3 win over the Cleveland Indians. He is the only player to ever hit for the cycle on Opening Day.
The drama film A Star Is Born starring Janet Gaynor and Fredric March premiered at Grauman's Chinese Theatre in Hollywood.
Born: George Takei, actor and activist, in Los Angeles

April 21, 1937 (Wednesday)
The Remington Rand strike ended when union members approved a settlement allowing them to return to their jobs.
Died: Saima Harmaja, 23, Finnish poet and writer (tuberculosis)

April 22, 1937 (Thursday)
Benito Mussolini hosted Austrian Chancellor Kurt Schuschnigg in Venice. Mussolini explained that since the Rome-Berlin Axis had been formed, Schuschnigg could no longer count on Italian military support if Hitler made a move against Austria.
Born: Jack Nicholson, actor, in Neptune City, New Jersey; Jack Nitzsche, musician, arranger, producer and songwriter, in Chicago (d. 2000)
Died: Arthur Edmund Carewe, 52, Armenian-American actor

April 23, 1937 (Friday)
The Oshawa Strike ended when General Motors gave in to most of the strikers' demands, though the company still refused to recognize the United Automobile Workers union.
The Madrid Defense Council was dissolved.
In Hungary, Ferenc Szálasi was sentenced to three months in prison and prohibited from holding office for three years for inciting people against the state as well as against Jews. 
Roosevelt Stadium opened in Jersey City, New Jersey.

April 24, 1937 (Saturday)
Britain and France allowed Belgium to withdraw from the security obligations of the Locarno Treaties.
Nationalist-controlled parts of Spain adopted the Roman salute except in the armed forces.
The BBC Television program For the Children first aired.
Died: Lucy Beaumont, 63, English actress

April 25, 1937 (Sunday)
The Soviet Union announced the completion of all goals of the five-year plan nine months to a year ahead of schedule. The announcement came despite numerous articles in the state-controlled press stating that many branches of the plan were lagging behind.
Died: Michał Drzymała, 79, Polish folk hero

April 26, 1937 (Monday)
Bombing of Guernica: The German Condor Legion razed the town of Guernica.

April 27, 1937 (Tuesday)
Wallis Simpson's divorce became permanent when the mandatory six months elapsed since the divorce decree was issued. The former Mrs. Simpson was now free to marry again.
The first social security payments were made in the United States under the Social Security Act of 1935.
Born: Sandy Dennis, actress, in Hastings, Nebraska (d. 1992); Robin Eames, Anglican primate and Archbishop of Armagh, in Belfast, Northern Ireland
Died: Antonio Gramsci, 46, Italian Marxist politician

April 28, 1937 (Wednesday)
The Nationalists captured Durango and Guernica.
Born: Saddam Hussein, 5th President of Iraq, in Al-Awja, Iraq (official date of birth) (d. 2006)

April 29, 1937 (Thursday)
The Irish Brigade fighting in Spain announced it was disbanding.
Francoist Spain claimed that Guernica had been destroyed by communist demolition teams.
Born: Jill Paton Walsh, author, in London, England (d. 2020)
Died: Wallace Carothers, 41, American chemist (suicide); Carmelo Delgado Delgado, 24, Puerto Rican political leader (killed in the Spanish Civil War); William Gillette, 83, American actor-manager and playwright

April 30, 1937 (Friday)
Women won the right to vote in the Philippines when a suffrage plebiscite passed with 90% approval.
The Nationalist battleship Espana accidentally hit a mine laid by its own side and sank off Santander.

References

1937
1937-04
1937-04